Galveodon is an extinct mammal of the Lower Cretaceous. It was a relatively early representative of the also extinct order of Multituberculata. It lived during 'the age of the dinosaurs'. It's within the suborder "Plagiaulacida" and family Paulchoffatiidae.

Genus: Galveodon (Hahn G & Hahn R, 1992)

Species: Galveodon nannothus (Hahn G & Hahn R, 1992) from the Barremian (Lower Cretaceous) Camarillas Formation of Galve, Spain. This species is represented by a tooth in the collection of the museum in Galve.

References 
 Hahn & Hahn (1992), Neue Multituberculates-Zähne aus der Unter-Kreide (Barremian) von Spanien (Galve und Una). Geologica et Parlaeontologica, 28, p. 143-162. (New multituberculate teeth from the Lower Cretaceous (Barremian) of Spain (Galve and Una).)
 Hahn G & Hahn R (2000), Multituberculates from the Guimarota mine, p. 97-107 in Martin T & Krebs B (eds), Guimarota - A Jurassic Ecosystem, Verlag Dr Friedrich Pfeil, München.
 Kielan-Jaworowska Z. and Hurum J.H. (2001), "Phylogeny and Systematics of multituberculate mammals". Paleontology 44, p. 389-429.
Much of this information has been derived from  Multituberculata Cope, 1884

Multituberculates
Cretaceous mammals of Europe
Barremian life
Cretaceous Spain
Fossils of Spain
Camarillas Formation
Fossil taxa described in 1922
Prehistoric mammal genera